ChemBioChem is a peer-reviewed scientific journal covering chemical biology, synthetic biology, and bio-nanotechnology and published by Wiley-VCH on behalf of Chemistry Europe. The journal publishes communications, full papers, reviews, minireviews, highlights, concepts, book reviews, and conference reports. Viewpoints, correspondence, essays, web sites, and databases are also occasionally featured. It is abstracted and indexed in major databases and has been online-only since 2016.

According to the Journal Citation Reports, the journal has a 2021 impact factor of 3.461.

References

External links

Chemistry Europe academic journals
Publications established in 2000
Biochemistry journals
English-language journals
Online-only journals
Journals published between 13 and 25 times per year
Wiley-VCH academic journals